Out There  is an Android and iOS game by French indie developer Mi-Clos Studio, released on February 27, 2014. It was later released on PC, Mac and Linux through Steam. An enhanced version titled Out There: Ω The Alliance was released on the Nintendo Switch on April 9, 2019.

Plot
The story begins in the 22nd century. Earth is exhausted of resources and no longer a viable planet for its human civilization, whose unsustainable growth made it impossible for developing society any further. An astronaut is sent to Ganymede, a moon of Jupiter, in order to find viable resources to supply Earth. Onboard of his ship, the Nomad, the astronaut sleeps in cryonics until reaching his destiny. Unfortunately, he wakes up in an unknown location, far away from the Earth.

Through his adventure, the astronaut meets many alien creatures. There are 3 civilizations that the astronaut interacts with that have a major impact: The Judges/Architects, responsible for the destruction of solar systems, Star Iron, an advanced AI that runs the stations the player can resupply in, and People Death, the original creators of Star Iron and survivors of another species whose homeworld was destroyed by the Judges/Architects. The game ending depends on which civilization the player decides to speak to or help. If he speaks to the Judges/Architects, he is only informed of what happened to him and to Earth.

If he confronts People Death and defeats them, they will see them as a sort of godly being, and allow him to use their army to ravage worlds. Only if the player helps Star Iron destroy the Judges/Architects enclave, can he use the wormhole of the system where the enclave was located to travel back to 22nd century Earth, and bring new technology and a new hope for Humanity. There is also a fourth ending, added in the "Omega Edition" of the game, in which the player uses one of the Arks left behind by humans who tried to flee Earth to colonize a new planet for Humanity and rebuild civilization anew.

Gameplay
Out There centers around exploration and resource management. The player starts with a ship equipped with some devices, fuel, oxygen, and hull metal, and can mine planets for more resources; a steady supply of them is necessary to continue progressing through the game. Along the way, the player will also discover a variety of aliens in space and planetside, as well as artifacts and abandoned spaceships, which can be stripped of equipment and resources or taken over. The final goal of the game is to travel across a sector of space to a faraway solar system.

Critical reception

The game has a Metacritic score of 85/100 based on 19 critic reviews.

Slide to Play wrote, "Out There is a wonderfully atmospheric resource management game that gets under your skin." TouchArcade said, "It works because Out There gets the threat of death right." GamesRadar+ said, "Despite a few niggling issues, Out There'''s melancholy atmosphere and challenging resource management will have you coming back for seconds. And thirds." USgamer described the game as "A sprawling, easy to play but surprisingly deep jaunt through the stars—and one with a beautifully crafted atmosphere sure to keep you coming back for more." AppleNApps said, "Out There offers an involved experience that you can truly get lost in, just like the main character is lost in space making it a must have title." Pocket Gamer said, "A vast, lonely game about space and time and death, Out There is by turns funny, exciting, and fresh."4Players wrote "Poignant, mysterious and deadly: This is an impressive odyssey in to space." Hyper Magazine deemed it "Solidly built and continually compelling." Eurogamer said "Out There also reveals something of the human pioneering spirit and its twin: the urge to survive till the final lungful of oxygen is expended. And if and when you do manage to scrape through another day, it's a game that allows you to marvel at the unlikeliness of all this as well as the miracle and fragility of life." Multiplayer.it said "Out There brings a great and melancholic journey in deep space, but the extreme reliance on luck can be frustrating." Digital Spy said "Out There is a game about controlling what you can, and adapting to what you can't, as a new story unfolds with each jump across the stars." Arcade Sushi said "While Out There is indisputably a well-crafted game, it’s also a game designed to cater to a specific crowd. Its harsh, survival-oriented gameplay harkens back to PC games of old, and though there are a number of choices which hamper the title's replayability, it’s still a uniquely memorable experience which will provide countless hours of fun for gamers who don’t mind frequently failing at a slow pace." Gamezebo wrote "Out There is a solidly built game that I can happily recommend to anyone looking for a proper adventure game, and to players who don't mind testing their luck over their ability to plan. It's worth mentioning that the game is largely text-based, so it's suitable for players of all skill levels."148Apps said "Out There is quite an interesting interstellar adventure, but the sheer level of randomness might turn off some players." Game Informer said "Many repeated playthroughs of Out There allow for a marginally higher survival rate, but the arbitrary chance for failure on an otherwise perfect run can be infuriating. If that indiscriminate failure is part of what you enjoy in roguelikes, Out There is a fascinating attempt to combine strategy with storytelling, and a worthy distraction for science-fiction enthusiasts." MacLife said "With atmosphere and story driving the slow-burning adventure, Out There is decidedly light on action and excitement. That said, it's the game's personality and surprises that will keep you pushing deeper into the stars." Gameblog.fr'' wrote "Out There is some kind of science fiction gamebook, where the difficulty changes depending the end you want to reach. This rogue-like doesn't feature combats, but it is still very interesting. And for this price, you should definitely try it."

References

2014 video games
Android (operating system) games
IOS games
Indie video games
Linux games
MacOS games
Nintendo Switch games
Survival video games
Video games developed in France
Video games using procedural generation
Windows games
Raw Fury games